William Henry Richardson (January 24, 1878 – November 6, 1949) was a first baseman in Major League Baseball. He played for the 1901 St. Louis Cardinals of the National League.

External links

1878 births
1949 deaths
Major League Baseball first basemen
St. Louis Cardinals players
Baseball players from Indiana
Minor league baseball managers
Galveston Sandcrabs players
Austin Senators players
Hampton Crabs players
Newport News Shipbuilders players
Terre Haute Hottentots players
South Bend Greens players
Dayton Veterans players
Hornell Pigmies players
Patton Pigmies players
People from Salem, Indiana